Rock Never Stops was a U.S. rock tour that featured various rock groups of the 1970s, 1980s, and 1990s. The tour started in 1997.

Tour lineup

The tour's lineup has shifted from year to year.

1997
 Alice Cooper
 Dokken
 Slaughter
 Warrant

1998
 Quiet Riot
 Warrant
 L.A. Guns
 Slaughter
 FireHouse
Hosted by Dee Snider

1999
 Ted Nugent
 Night Ranger
 Quiet Riot
 Slaughter

2000
 Sebastian Bach

2001
Sebastian Bach

2002
 Tesla
 Vince Neil
 Jackyl
 Skid Row

2003
 Whitesnake
 Warrant
 Kip Winger
 Slaughter

2004
 Vince Neil
 Ratt
 Slaughter

2005
 Cinderella
 Quiet Riot
 Ratt
 FireHouse

2012
 Dokken
 Quiet Riot
 Firehouse
 Y&T
 Trixter
 Tour was planned but never took place

See also
 Concert tour

References

External links
 Rock Never Stops 2005: Cinderella, Ratt, Quiet Riot & FireHouse interviewed by C.C. Banana

Concert tours